San Pietro is a small, medieval, Romanesque style, Roman Catholic church in the comune of Grosseto, Tuscany.

The first documentation of a church at the site dates to 1188. Recent restorations have found structural elements dating to the 9th century. Of the Romanesque elements remaining are four sculpted panels with figures, animals, and decoration. The interior contains a Gothic inscription from 1235, recalling the consecration under the conte Ildebrandino Aldobrandeschi. A 17th-century crucifix has been placed inside deriving from a church in Grancia.

The church was restored in 2005 and since 2010 has been also officiated by the Romanian Orthodox Church.

References

Pietro Grosseto
Pietro Grosseto
Pietro Grosseto
Churches completed in 1235